Switzerland competed at the 1972 Winter Olympics in Sapporo, Japan.

Medalists

Alpine skiing

Men

Men's slalom

Women

Bobsleigh

Cross-country skiing

Men

Men's 4 × 10 km relay

Figure skating

Women

Ice hockey

First round
Winners (in bold) entered the medal round. Other teams played a consolation round for 7th–11th places.

|}

Consolation round
Teams that lost their games in the qualification round played in this group.

West Germany 5-0 Switzerland
Japan 3-3 Switzerland
Switzerland 3-3 Yugoslavia
Norway 5-3 Switzerland

Ski jumping

References
Official Olympic Reports
International Olympic Committee results database
 Olympic Winter Games 1972, full results by sports-reference.com

Nations at the 1972 Winter Olympics
1972 Winter Olympics
1972 in Swiss sport